Tony Johnson is a New Zealand sound engineer. He has been nominated for three Academy Awards in the category Best Sound Mixing. He has worked on more than 30 films since 1981.

Selected filmography
 The Chronicles of Narnia: The Lion, the Witch and the Wardrobe (2005)
 Avatar (2009)
 The Hobbit: The Desolation of Smaug (2013)

References

External links

Year of birth missing (living people)
Living people
New Zealand audio engineers